Heinrich Ernst Ferdinand Guericke (25 February 1803, Wettin – 4 February 1878, Halle an der Saale), was a German theologian.

He was born at Wettin in Saxony and studied theology at the University of Halle, where he was appointed associate professor in 1829.  He disapproved of the union between the Lutheran and the Reformed churches, which had been accomplished by the Prussian government in 1817, and in 1833 he joined the Old Lutherans. In 1835 he lost his professorship, but he regained it in 1840.

Published works 
Among his works were a biography of August Hermann Francke, "August Hermann Francke. Eine Denkschrift zur Säcularfeier seines Todes" (1827) — later translated into English as: "The life of Augustus Herman Franké" (1837). He was also the author of:
 "Handbuch der Kirchengeschichte" (1833); translated into English by William G. T. Shedd (2 volumes):
 "A manual of church history : ancient church history, comprising the first six centuries".
 "A manual of church history : mediaeval church history, A.D. 590 - A.D. 1073".
 "Lehrbuch der christlich kirchlichen Archäologie" (1847); translated into English by A.J.W. Morrison as "Manual of the antiquities of the church" (1851). 
 "Allgemeine christliche Symbolik : ein theologisches Handbuch" (3rd edition, 1861).

In 1840, with Andreas Gottlob Rudelbach, he founded the "Zeitschrift für die gesammte lutherische Theologie und Kirche".

Translated works available online
Manual of the Antiquities of the Church
A Manual of Church History, Comprising the First Six Centuries
A Manual of Church History: Mediaeval Church History, A.D. 590 - A.D. 1073

References 

1803 births
1878 deaths
People from Saalekreis
German Lutheran theologians
University of Halle alumni
Academic staff of the University of Halle
19th-century German Protestant theologians
19th-century German male writers
German male non-fiction writers
19th-century Lutherans
19th-century Lutheran theologians